Zavodskoy (Zavody posjolok) is an urban locality (urban-type settlement) under the administrative jurisdiction of Promyshlenny City District of the town of republican significance of Vladikavkaz, the Republic of North Ossetia-Alania, Russia. Population:

References

Notes

Sources

Urban-type settlements in North Ossetia–Alania